Inverlochy House (also known as Inverlochie House and Inverlochy Flats) is a historic building and art school in Wellington, New Zealand.

The house was originally built for the Wellingtonian councillor Kennedy Macdonald in 1878. When the estate was auctioned in 1893, due to Macdonald's bankruptcy, the building was described as having:

In 1980 the Williams Development Holdings Limited gifted Inverlochy House to the New Zealand Academy of Fine Arts for the use of the Williams School of Art at Inverlochy Incorporated.

The building is classified as a Category 2 historic building by Heritage New Zealand.

References

External links 
 Inverlochy Art School
 The Haunting of Inverlochy House in Wellington (TVNZ documentary) - youtube.com

Heritage New Zealand Category 2 historic places in the Wellington Region
Buildings and structures in Wellington City
Art schools in New Zealand
1870s architecture in New Zealand